The Thirty-Five Confession Buddhas  are known from the Sutra of the Three Heaps (Sanskrit: Triskandhadharmasutra; Tib. phung po gsum pa'i mdo), popular in Tibetan Buddhism. This Mahāyāna sutra actually describes the practice of purification by confession and making prostrations to these Buddhas, and is part of the larger Stack of Jewels Sutra (Sanskrit: Ratnakutasutra;).

In Tibet there were two distinct traditions of the Thirty-five Confession Buddhas which arose  from the two main Indian schools of Mahāyāna Buddhism: one from the  Madhyamaka school founded by Nāgārjuna, and the other from the Yogācāra school founded by Asaṅga and Vasubandhu. Both of these schools developed their own rituals for conferring the Bodhisattva vows, each incorporating a visualization of the Thirty-five Buddhas along with the recitation of the confession from the Triskhandhadharma Sutra.

List of Names
The names of the 35 Buddhas of confession differ depending on the sutra. A common classification in Tibetan Buddhism is as follows:

Iconography
The Thirty-Five Confession Buddhas are a common subject depicted in Himalayan Buddhist paintings and sculpture. There are at least three different iconographic systems for depicting the Thirty-Five Buddhas, based on the different descriptions found in ritual texts  and commentaries by different authors including Nagarjuna, Sakya Paṇḍita, Jonang Tāranātha  and Je Tsongkhapa.

The three main iconographic traditions are:
 The system attributed to Nagarjuna where the 35 Buddhas are depicted with different objects in their hands,
 The system of Sakya Paṇḍita where the 35 Buddhas are depicted with hand gestures only (no hand objects), and
 The system based on Je Tsongkhapa's personal vision of the 35 Buddhas, where only some of the Buddhas have objects in their hands.

See also 
 Twenty-Eight Buddhas
 List of bodhisattvas

Notes

References

External links

The Dharma of Dancing

Buddhas
Mahayana sutras